Room with a View is the debut album of Canadian country music artist Carolyn Dawn Johnson, and was released on August 7, 2001 on Arista Nashville. Certified gold by the CRIA, it produced the singles "Georgia", "Complicated", "I Don't Want You to Go", and "One Day Closer to You".

Track listing

ATrack only available on Canadian release of album.

Personnel
Compiled from liner notes.

Musicians

 Al Anderson – acoustic guitar (9, 10), electric guitar (9)
 Matraca Berg – background vocals (9)
 Steve Brewster – drum programming (2, 7)
 Kim Carnes – background vocals (9)
 Matt Chamberlain – drums (2, 7)
 Joe Chemay – bass guitar (3-5)
 J. T. Corenflos – electric guitar (2-7)
 Dan Dugmore – Dobro (2)
 Paul Franklin – steel guitar (1, 2, 6-8, 11)
 John Hobbs – keyboards (1, 8-11), Hammond B-3 organ (1, 9), piano (8, 10), synthesizer (11)
 Dann Huff – electric guitar (3-7)
 Mary Ann Kennedy – background vocals (8)
 Carolyn Dawn Johnson – lead vocals, background vocals, acoustic guitar (3, 6, 7, 11)
 John Jorgenson – electric guitar (1, 11), 12-string guitar (8)
 Tim Lauer – accordion (1)
 B. James Lowry – acoustic guitar (2, 7)
 Martina McBride – background vocals (1)
 Terry McMillan – percussion (1, 3-6, 8, 11)
 Steve Mandile – electric guitar (1, 6, 7, 10), acoustic guitar (6, 8)
 Steve Nathan – keyboards (2-7), Hammond B-3 organ (2, 4, 6), piano (3)
 Greg Morrow – drums (1, 3-6, 8-11), percussion (8, 9, 10)
 Curt Ryle – acoustic guitar (3-5)
 Jason Sellers – background vocals (7)
 Marty Stuart – mandolin (10)
 Biff Watson – acoustic guitar, bouzouki (4), 12-string guitar (9)
 Glenn Worf – bass guitar (except 3-5)
 Paul Worley – acoustic guitar (1, 3, 7, 8, 11), 12-string guitar (1, 2)
 Jonathan Yudkin – fiddle (5-7)

Technical
 Eric Conn – digital editing
 Paige Connors – production coordination
 Carlos Grier – digital editing
 Carolyn Dawn Johnson – production
 Mike Poole – recording
 Denny Purcell – mastering
 Clarke Schleicher – recording, mixing
 Paul Worley – production

Charts

Weekly charts

Year-end charts

References

2001 debut albums
Arista Records albums
Carolyn Dawn Johnson albums
Albums produced by Paul Worley
Canadian Country Music Association Album of the Year albums